Chris Lightfoot  (4 August 1978 – 11 February 2007) was an English scientist and political activist. He was the first developer, with Tom Steinberg, at e-democracy charity mySociety.

Family and early life
He was born in Dulwich, England, in 1978. His mother, Prue, was a journalist and his father, Robert, was a patent agent. His older sister Steph taught him how to program the family's BBC Micro. He used this knowledge of programming to produce a crater investigation model in the physics department at Westminster which was of an extremely high standard. This was part of a physics project in which he was awarded a 15 Merit — an outstanding and very rare full mark.

He attended Westminster School, where he was part of the team representing the school in the British Informatics Olympiad. He began his undergraduate studies at Clare College, Cambridge focusing on Physics while studying a Natural Science Tripos. He graduated with a Master's degree in 2000.

Chris was one of the founders of Mythic Beasts, an ISP.

Death
He had suffered from depression throughout his adult life. Lightfoot died by suicide on 11 February 2007.

Contributions to Internet
He played an important role in the development of:

 PledgeBank, which addresses the prisoner's dilemma for all sorts of social-good projects;
 YourHistoryHere.com — a site where people can annotate a map with their knowledge of the history of that place.
 Placeopedia — an online gazetteer that is a mashup of Google Maps and the English Wikipedia.
 TheyWorkForYou — tracks speeches and activities of Members of Parliament, including presenting an accessible version of Hansard
 WriteToThem.com — facilitates contacting elected representatives at all levels of UK government.
 HearFromYourMP.com — a site encouraging MPs to email their constituents.
 hassleme.co.uk — "Because your mother can't remind you of everything."
 DowningStreetSays.com — searchable text of the Prime Minister's Spokesman's briefings.
 Downing Street e-Petitions — a petitions website for 10 Downing Street.
 FixMyStreet — another map-based application facilitating citizens informing their local authority of problems needing their attention, such as broken streetlamps etc.
 tpop3d — a pop3 server
 vmail-sql — vmail-sql, a virtual email hosting system backed by MySQL
 Political Survey and  — An attempt to generate a multi-axis political model based solely on principal components analysis of survey results, rather than preconceived axes.
WhatDoTheyKnow is dedicated to Chris, who thought up the idea of automatically republishing email responses 
Mythic beasts (ISP), co-founder of the Cambridge based hosting ISP.
 He also did additional coding on the video game LittleBigPlanet, which was released a year after his death. The game was dedicated to his memory.

References

External links
 Chris's Blog
 mySociety obituary
 Guardian Obituary
 Times obituary
 Colleague obituary and tribute

British scientists
British activists
Alumni of Clare College, Cambridge
1978 births
2007 suicides
MySociety